Tokmak Raion was one of raions (districts) of Zaporizhzhia Oblast in southern Ukraine. The administrative center of the region was the town of Tokmak, which did not belong to the raion and was incorporated separately as a town of regional significance. The raion was abolished on 18 July 2020 as part of the administrative reform of Ukraine, which reduced the number of raions of Zaporizhzhia Oblast to five. The area of Tokmak Raion was merged into Polohy Raion.

References

Former raions of Zaporizhzhia Oblast
1923 establishments in Ukraine
Ukrainian raions abolished during the 2020 administrative reform